Boris Bede (born November 20, 1989) is a French-born Canadian football placekicker and punter for the Toronto Argonauts of the Canadian Football League (CFL). He first enrolled at Tiffin University before transferring to Université Laval. Bede has been nicknamed "Boom Boom" for his strong leg on kickoffs and punts.

Early years
Bede was born in Toulon, France and grew up playing soccer. He arrived in the United States in 2005 and played American football at Framingham High School in Framingham, Massachusetts. He also participated in soccer and track and field for the Flyers.

College career
Bede played American football for the Tiffin Dragons of Tiffin University from 2008 to 2010, earning Honorable Mention All-GLIAC honors in 2009.

In the summer of 2011, Bede was on the verge of playing soccer for the Sherbrooke Vert et Or of the Université de Sherbrooke before deciding to play Canadian football at Université Laval. He played for the Laval Rouge et Or from 2011 to 2014. He made 63 of his 78 field goal attempts, including a career-long 44-yarder in 2013, during his college career. Bede also accumulated 39.4 yards per punt on 292 punts. He was named to the RSEQ All-Star team in 2012, 2013 and 2014. He was also named the Quebec Conference's special teams player of the year in 2014. Bede helped the Rouge et Or win the 48th Vanier Cup in 2012 and the 49th Vanier Cup in 2013 after the Rouge et Or lost the 47th Vanier Cup in 2011.

Professional career

Montreal Alouettes
Bede signed with the Montreal Alouettes of the CFL on February 19, 2015. He attempted and later made the first 32-yard extra point in the league's history on June 25, 2015. Bede had a very successful first season in the CFL, converting 36 out of 40 field goal attempts (90% success rate, second highest in the league); he did however miss on 6 of 31, extra-point converts. For his efforts, he was named a CFL East All-Star in his rookie season. Bede struggled mightily at the start of the 2016 season and was effectively benched by the Alouettes' seventh game of the season, having made only 7 out of 16 field goal attempts, before returning as the starting kicker by the Alouettes' 15th game of the season. After re-gaining his position, he was the Alouettes' kicker and punter through the 2019 CFL season, where he played in 80 regular season games connecting on 141 field goals out of 171 attempts for a success rate of 82.5%. He had punted 510 times for an average of 44.2 yards.

Toronto Argonauts
On February 13, 2020, Bede was traded to the Toronto Argonauts for fellow kicker Tyler Crapigna. Bede re-signed with the Argonauts on December 31, 2020. On July 4, 2022 Bede missed the game tying extra point attempt with only 25 seconds remaining in the fourth quarter, resulting in the Winnipeg Blue Bombers winning the contest.

International career
Bede played for the France national American football team in the 2014 EFAF European Championship.

Personal life
Bede's father, Alain Bédé, played for the Ivory Coast national football team. His brother Kévin Baillili played football, in French lower leagues for Evry FC, SC Toulon-Le Las, AS Poissy as well the second team of Paris St Germain and more recently for Trois-Bassins FC of Réunion.

References

External links
Toronto Argonauts bio

1989 births
Living people
American football placekickers
American football punters
Canadian football placekickers
Canadian football punters
French sportspeople of Ivorian descent
French players of American football
French players of Canadian football
Laval Rouge et Or football players
Montreal Alouettes players
Sportspeople from Framingham, Massachusetts
Sportspeople from Toulon
Players of American football from Massachusetts
Tiffin Dragons football players
Toronto Argonauts players
Framingham High School alumni